Frederick Charles "Fireball" Wenz (August 26, 1941 – October 6, 2020) was a middle relief pitcher in Major League Baseball who played from 1968 through 1970 for the Boston Red Sox (1968–69) and Philadelphia Phillies (1970).

Wenz was signed as an amateur free agent by the San Francisco Giants out of Somerville High School in 1959.

He earned his nickname as a minor leaguer when he struck out more than one batter per inning during his time in the Red Sox' farm system.
 
In 31 relief appearances, Wenz posted a 3–0 record with a 4.68 ERA and one save, giving up 22 runs (one unearned) on 36 hits and 25 walks while striking out 38 in 42 innings of work.

Wenz died on October 6, 2020, in Branchburg, New Jersey.

References

External  links

Sons of Sam Horn

1941 births
2020 deaths
Artesia Giants players
Baseball players from New Jersey
Boston Red Sox players
Eugene Emeralds players
Hastings Giants players
Louisville Colonels (minor league) players
Major League Baseball pitchers
Olean Red Sox players
People from Bound Brook, New Jersey
Philadelphia Phillies players
Pittsfield Red Sox players
Pocatello Bannocks players
Pocatello Chiefs players
Reading Red Sox players
Somerville High School (New Jersey) alumni
Sportspeople from Somerset County, New Jersey
Toronto Maple Leafs (International League) players
Waterloo Hawks (baseball) players
Winston-Salem Red Sox players
Belmont Chiefs players